Garcia nutans is a species of plant in the family Euphorbiaceae. It is widespread across Mexico from Sinaloa and San Luis Potosí to Chiapas + Yucatán, as well as being native to Central America, Colombia, and Venezuela.

References

Aleuritideae
Flora of Colombia
Flora of Mexico
Flora of Central America
Flora of Venezuela
Endangered plants
Endangered biota of Mexico
Taxa named by Martin Vahl
Taxonomy articles created by Polbot